Ian Curtis Wedde  (born 17 October 1946) is a New Zealand poet, fiction writer, critic, and art curator.

Biography
Born in Blenheim, New Zealand, Wedde lived in East Pakistan and England as a child before returning to New Zealand. He attended King's College and the University of Auckland, graduating with an MA in English in 1968.

Wedde started publishing poetry in 1966. He travelled in Jordan and England in the late 1960s and early 1970s, and returned to New Zealand to live in Port Chalmers in 1972. In 1975 he moved to Wellington.

From 1983 to 1990 Wedde was the art critic for The Evening Post. He co-edited The Penguin Book of New Zealand Verse with Harvey McQueen in the mid 1980s, and The Penguin Book of Contemporary New Zealand Poetry with McQueen and Miriama Evans in 1989. He became the arts project manager at Te Papa in 1994.

A collection of essays, Making Ends Meet, was published in 2005.

Wedde was appointed an Officer of the New Zealand Order of Merit in the 2010 Queen's Birthday Honours, for services to art and literature.

Poetry collections
 1971: Homage to Matisse
 1974: Made Over
 1975: Pathway to the Sea
 1975: Earthly: Sonnets for Carlos
 1977: Spells for Coming Out
 1980: Castally: Poems 1973–1977
 1984: Tales of Gotham City
 1984: Georgicon
 1987: Driving into the Storm: Selected Poems
 1988: Tendering
 1993: The Drummer
 2001: The Commonplace Odes
 2005: Three Regrets and A Hymn to Beauty

Fiction
 1976: Dick Seddon’s Great Dive, winner of the Book Award for Fiction in 1977
 1981: The Shirt Factory and Other Stories
 1986: Symmes Hole
 1988: Survival Arts
 2005: Chinese Opera
 2006: The Viewing Platform
 2020: The Reed Warbler

Notes

References
New Zealand Book Council
New Zealand electronic poetry centre
New Zealand electronic text centre

External links
Interview with Ian Wedde for Cultural Icons project. Audio.
NZ 6-Seater: A Chapbook Curated by Ian Wedde. eChapbook.

1946 births
Living people
New Zealand poets
New Zealand Poets Laureate
New Zealand male poets
Officers of the New Zealand Order of Merit
People from Blenheim, New Zealand
University of Auckland alumni